Drmanovina (Serbian Cyrillic: Дрмановина) is a mountain in western Serbia, near the town of Kosjerić.

References

Mountains of Serbia